Tudor Deliu (born 29 October 1955) is a politician, professor, associate professor and lecturer from Moldova. He has been a member of the Parliament of Moldova since 2010 on the lists of the Liberal Democratic Party of Moldova, acting as chairperson of the parliamentary faction of PLDM and secretary of the "Parliamentary Commission, Appointments and Immunities". Currently he is the Chairman of Liberal Democratic Party of Moldova.

Professional activity
In the period 1990-1994, Deliu was mayor of Răzeni village in Ialoveni District.

Political activity
Tudor Deliu was the first president of the social-political movement "For the Nation and Country Party" (now the Greater Moldova Party) from 5 May 2007 to the summer of 2008, when the party joined the Liberal Democratic Party of Moldova. Subsequently, Tudor Deliu was on the PLDM electoral lists, but the movement continued to function.

In 2014 he was included in position 52 in the "TOP 100 most influential politicians of November 2014" (from the Republic of Moldova) in the version of  Institute for Political Analysis and Consultancy ”POLITICON”.

On 9 September 2018, at the 7th Congress of the Liberal Democratic Party of Moldova, Tudor Deliu was elected the new party's president.

According to the polls made in 2019 referring to the most popular politicians of the Republic of Moldova, Tudor Deliu is positioned eleventh among the top of politicians in which Moldovans have the highest trust and in another opinion poll it was positioned on the thirteenth position.

Personal life
He is a football fan, played football and even coached a local team. He is married and has 3 children. Besides Romanian, he also speaks French and Russian. Tudor Deliu is a veteran of the armed conflict on the left bank of the Dniester, where he was the Major General of the Carabinieri.

External links 
 Tudor Deliu | Pagină personală
 Site-ul Parlamentului Republicii Moldova

References

1955 births
Living people
Moldovan MPs 2014–2018
Liberal Democratic Party of Moldova MPs
Moldovan MPs 2010–2014
Moldovan philologists